Hausen Shwahiri bin Hasboni Shawal (born 9 January 2001) is a Malaysian footballer who plays for UiTM as a forward.

References

External links
 

Living people
2001 births
Malaysian footballers
UiTM FC players
Malaysia Super League players
Association football forwards